Irion County High School is a public high school located in Mertzon, Texas (US) and classified as a 1A school by the UIL. It is part of the Irion County Independent School District located in east central Irion County. In 2015, the school was rated "Met Standard" by the Texas Education Agency.

Residents in Sherwood, Barnhart, and Mertzon are enrolled in the Irion County school district.

In the 2015-2016 school year, the West Texas Boys Ranch left the school, due to administrative pressure.

It is one of top rated 1a schools in Texas.

Athletics

Boys  
Basketball 
Cross Country
Football
Golf
Powerlifting
Tennis
Track and Field

Girls 
Basketball 
Cross Country
Football
Golf
Powerlifting
Tennis
Track and Field
Cheerleading

State Titles
Boys Track 
2001(1A), 2002(1A)

Band

State Titles
Marching Band - 
1993(1A), 2019 (1A)
Marching Band Sweepstakes - 
1986(1A), 1991(1A)

One Act Play

Awards
2012: 2nd runner up at State competition performing A Streetcar Named Desire directed by Billy McDaris.
2011: Advanced to Regional level competition where they were the alternate to state with their performance in A Lie of the Mind, directed by Billy McDaris.
2009: Advanced to the Regional level where they received several honorable mentions and Best Actor for their performance of The Bridegroom of Blowing Rock, also directed by Billy McDaris.

References

External links
Irion County ISD

Public high schools in Texas
Public middle schools in Texas